Eclipse is a limited edition release album by the Canadian band Rhea's Obsession. Only 500 numbered copies were made and sold at live shows. with 500 numbered copies sold at live shows.  It includes music from the group's early days as well as songs later included on Between Earth and Sky.

Track listing
 "Anila (Theme from Dead Souls)" – 2:41
 "Between Earth and Sky (early mix)" – 4:37
 "Too Deep (deeper mix)" – 4:12
 "Spill Elixir (precipice comp mix)" – 6:51
 "Slow Acting Poison" – 4:32
 "Cun Lacoudhir (original acoustic recording)" – 4:59
 "Tabulae Anatomacae Sex Theme" – 4:24
 "Anxia (from the series Psi Factor)" – 4:44
 "Breakthrough (Projekt comp mix)" – 4:13

Rhea's Obsession albums
1999 compilation albums